The Bhartiya Ratna Award (translated as Jewel of the Industry Award) is conferred annually to Indian citizens, for their outstanding contribution to the economic development of the country. The award is conferred by the Institute of Economic Studies, India (IES), affiliated with the government of India and the selection is done by a panel of judges who are usually eminent citizens with economic backgrounds. Nominations are made by the existing members, and absolute care is taken that there is no bias or favoritism. Normally there are hundreds of nominees and it takes several weeks or sometimes months of scrutiny to short-list and finalize the recipients.

Winners 
 Kailash Das
 Motilal Oswal
 Dhananjay Datar
 Lila Poonawalla
 Narendra Bansal
 Ajit Narain Haksar
 Surinder Mehta
 Om Prakash Munjal 
 Viresh Oberoi
 Anu Malhotra
 Shaurya Doval
 Rakesh Bakshi
 Hariharan Chandrashekar
 Raakesh Raj
 Kamlesh Surti

References

 

Indian awards
Economy of India